José Matías Aguilera Tapia (born 31 January 2000) is a Chilean footballer who plays for AC Barnechea.

International career
At early age, he represented Chile at under-15 level at the 2015 South American U-15 Championship and winning the friendly 2015 Aspire Tri-Series International Tournament in Doha, Qatar.

Honours

Club
Coquimbo Unido
 Primera B (1): 2021

International
Chile U15
 Aspire Tri-Series International Tournament: 2015

References

External links

José Aguilera at playmakerstats.com (English version of ceroacero.es)

2000 births
Living people
People from Limarí Province
Chilean footballers
Chile youth international footballers
Chilean Primera División players
Primera B de Chile players
Colo-Colo footballers
Puerto Montt footballers
San Marcos de Arica footballers
Coquimbo Unido footballers
A.C. Barnechea footballers
Association football forwards